The Croatian World Club Championship is a FIFA sanctioned international football tournament for Croatian diaspora football clubs. Founded in 2007, the tournament is organised by the Croatian Football Federation on behalf of the Croatian Heritage Foundation and Ministry of Foreign Affairs of Croatia.

History

The Croatian World Club Championship was founded in 2007 by the Croatian Heritage Foundation and Ministry of Foreign Affairs of Croatia. The tournament is held every four years in Croatia by various host cities and venues. Clubs and teams with Croatian heritage or connections (Croatian diaspora) from around the world are selected for invitation to participate in the eight team tournament.

The inaugural tournament was hosted by Zagreb and surrounding region between 24 and 30 June 2007. Toronto Croatia won the first championship with a 3–1 victory over runner-up Canberra Croatia. Croatian Football Federation president Vlatko Marković presented Toronto the Championship trophy. Burgenland Croatian finished third.

The second tournament was hosted by Split and surrounding region between 26 June and 1 July 2011. Toronto Croatia claimed back to back titles in 2011 with a 5–0 victory in the championship final over runner-up Canberra Croatia. SV Dinamo Ottakring finished third.

The third edition of the tournament was hosted by Zagreb and surrounding region between 28 June and 4 July 2015. NK Pajde Möhlin won its first title in the 2015 edition of the tournament with a 4–0 victory in the championship final over runner-up Vojvođanski Hrvati. Toronto Croatia finished third.

Format of Championship

Structure

 8 teams compete
 Those 8 teams are separated into 2 groups of 4 teams each
 Winner of each group advances to the championship final
 Runner-up of each group advances to bronze play-off

Rules

 3 points for a win
 1 point for a draw
 0 points for a loss
 Goal differences used to differentiate two teams on equal points in group stage

Schedule

 Group matches are played over three game days, each consisting of two matches
 The bronze play-off and championship final are played on the same day (fourth game day)

2007 Championship 

The inaugural tournament was hosted by Zagrab and surrounding region between 24 and 30 June 2007. The eight teams selected to participate were: Toronto Croatia (Canada), SC Croat San Pedro (USA), HNK Zrinski Chicago (USA) from CONCACAF, Sydney United (Australia) from AFC, NK Croatia Essen (Germany), SD Croatia Berlin (Germany), AS Croatia Villefranche (France) and Burgenland Croatian (Austria) from UEFA. Of these only Burgenland was not an established club, but rather a selection side assembled after the Croatian World Games. Sydney United had to withdraw from the tournament due to financial and organisational reasons, so Canberra FC (known as Canberra Croatia at the tournament) stepped in to participate.

Group A 
  Toronto Croatia
  NK Croatia Essen
  SC Croat San Pedro
  Burgenland Croats

25 June 2007
Toronto Croatia - Burgenland Croatian 1:0 (0:0)
NK Croatia Essen - SC Croat San Pedro 0:3 (0:2) 
27 June 2007
Burgenland Croatian - SC Croat San Pedro 1:1 (0:1)
Toronto Croatia - NK Croatia Essen 9:0 (4:0)
28 June 2007
Burgenland Croatian - NK Croatia Essen 5:0 (2:0)
Toronto Croatia - SC Croat San Pedro 2:1 (1:1)

Group B 
  Canberra Croatia
  SD Croatia Berlin
  HNK Zrinski Chicago
  AS Croatia Villefranche

25 June 2007
SD Croatia Berlin - HNK Zrinski Chicago 1:3 (1:2)
AS Croatia Villefranche - Canberra Croatia 1:5 (0:0) 
27 June 2007
AS Croatia Villefranche - HNK Zrinski Chicago 0:3 (0:1)
Canberra Croatia - SD Croatia Berlin 2:2 (1:1)
28 June 2007
AS Croatia Villefranche - SD Croatia Berlin 1:6 (0:3) 
Canberra Croatia - HNK Zrinski Chicago 3:1 (1:1)

Bronze play-off

Final

2011 Championship 

The second tournament was hosted by Split and surrounding region between 26 June - 2 July 2011. The eight teams selected to participate were: Toronto Croatia (Canada) and SC Croat San Pedro (USA) from CONCACAF, Canberra Croatia (Australia) from AFC, SV Dinamo Ottakring (Austria), SD Croatia Berlin (Germany), NK Croatia Zürich (Switzerland), NK Croatia Stuttgart (Germany) and NK Pajde Möhlin (Switzerland) from UEFA.

Group A 
  Toronto Croatia
  SV Dinamo Ottakring
  SD Croatia Berlin
  NK Croatia Zürich

26 June 2011
Toronto Croatia - NK Croatia Zürich 4:1 
SD Croatia Berlin - SV Dinamo Ottakring 2:3 
28 June 2011
Toronto Croatia - SV Dinamo Ottakring 3:0 
SD Croatia Berlin - NK Croatia Zürich 0:0 
30 June 2011
Toronto Croatia - SD Croatia Berlin 2:0 
SV Dinamo Ottakring - NK Croatia Zürich 0:0

Group B 
  Canberra Croatia
  NK Pajde Möhlin
  NK Croatia Stuttgart
  SC Croat San Pedro

Final group placings source:
26 June 2011
Match details TBD 
Match details TBD 
28 June 2011
Match details TBD 
Match details TBD
30 June 2011
Match details TBD 
Match details TBD

Bronze play-off

Final

2015 Championship 

The third tournament was hosted by Zagreb and surrounding region between 28 June - 4 July 2015. The eight teams selected to participate were: Toronto Croatia (Canada) from CONCACAF, Sydney United 58 (Australia) and Canberra Croatia (Australia) from AFC, AS Croatia Villefranche (France), Vojvođanski Hrvati (Serbia), Croatia Malmö (Sweden), NK Croatia Stuttgart (Germany) and NK Pajde Möhlin (Switzerland) from UEFA. Of these only Vojvođanski Hrvati was not an established club, but rather a selection side from the autonomous region of Vojvodina in Serbia's north.

Croatian Football Federation President Davor Šuker and Zagreb Mayor Milan Bandić officially opened the tournament.

Group A 
  Toronto Croatia
  Vojvođanski Hrvati
  Sydney United 58
  AS Croatia Villefranche

28 June 2015
17:30 | Stadion Hrvatskog dragovoljca | Toronto Croatia - Sydney United 58 | 5:2 (1:1) 
29 June 2015
18:30 | Stadion Hrvatskog dragovoljca | AS Croatia Villefranche - Vojvođanski Hrvati | 1:3 
1 July 2015
16:00 | Stadion Intera, Zaprešić | Vojvođanski Hrvati - Sydney United 58 | 3:1 
19:30 | Stadion Intera, Zaprešić | Toronto Croatia - AS Croatia Villefranche | 1:1 (0:0)
2 July 2015
18:30 | Stadion Lučko | Vojvođanski Hrvati - Toronto Croatia | 2:2 (1:0) 
18:30 | Stadion Rudeša | Sydney United 58 - AS Croatia Villefranche | 0:6

Group B 
  Canberra Croatia
  NK Pajde Möhlin
  NK Croatia Stuttgart
  Croatia Malmö

29 June 2015
16:30 | Stadion Sesveta | Canberra Croatia - Croatia Malmö | 0:0 (0:0) 
18:30 | Stadion Sesveta | NK Croatia Stuttgart - NK Pajde Möhlin | 0:2 (0:2) 
1 July 2015
16:30 | Stadion Gorice | NK Pajde Möhlin - Croatia Malmö | 3:2 (1:2) 
18:30 | Stadion Gorice | Canberra Croatia - NK Croatia Stuttgart | 3:1 (1:0)
2 July 2015
18:30 | Stadion Lučko | NK Pajde Möhlin - Canberra Croatia | 4:1 (1:1) 
18:30 | Stadion Rudeša | Croatia Malmö - NK Croatia Stuttgart | 1:1

Bronze play-off

Final

References

External links 
HNS-vijesti Croatian Football Federation news

Football competitions in Croatia
Recurring sporting events established in 2007
June sporting events
Croatian diaspora